The Sony Ericsson W950i is the third UIQ 3 smartphone based on Symbian OS v9.1. It was announced on February 13, 2006, a week after the announcement of the Sony Ericsson M600.

Background 
The W950 is Sony Ericsson's sixth Walkman phone. One of its distinguishing features is the 4 GB internal flash memory in which you can store many songs. However, it does not support any type of memory card.

Developing for the W950i 
Since the W950i is based upon the UIQ platform, it is easy to make third party applications that can be downloaded to the phone. Developers can choose their preferred programming language (Java, C++, etc.) and IDE (Visual Studio, CodeWarrior, Eclipse, Carbide, NetBeans).

External links 

 Official Sony Ericsson W958c Webpage
 Official Sony Ericsson W950i Webpage
 Sony Ericsson
 UIQ
 Official UIQ developer portal
 Sony Ericsson W950 walkman announced - Article from All About Symbian

W950i
UIQ 3 Phones
Mobile phones introduced in 2006
Mobile phones with infrared transmitter